The Eagle Hills are a low mountain range in the Southern Coast Ranges, in eastern San Luis Obispo County, California.

References 

Transverse Ranges
Mountain ranges of San Luis Obispo County, California
Hills of California
Mountain ranges of Southern California